Avolatavis is an extinct genus of stem-parrot (pan-psittaciform) or a member of the stem group of Psittacopasseres (the clade including both parrots and passerines), known from the early Eocene Fossil Butte Member of the Green River Formation of Wyoming, United States, and from the London Clay of Walton-on-the-Naze (Essex, United Kingdom). It was first named by Daniel T. Ksepka and Julia A. Clarke in 2012 and the type species is Avolatavis tenens. Gerald Mayr and Andrew C. Kitchener described the second species, A. europaeus, in 2023. Mayr and Kitchener assigned Avolatavis to the family Vastanavidae, which might be early diverging stem group presentatives of Pan-Psittaciformes or stem group representatives of Psittacopasseres.

References

Eocene birds
Fossil taxa described in 2012
Bird genera
Paleogene birds of Europe
Paleogene birds of North America